The Melodi Grand Prix Junior 2010 was Norway's ninth national Melodi Grand Prix Junior for young singers aged 8 to 15. It was held in Oslo Spektrum, Oslo, Norway and broadcast live Norwegian Broadcasting Corporation (NRK).

The winner was Torstein Snekvik with the song "Svikter aldri igjen" (Norwegian for Never fails again). The trophy that was handed to him by 2009's winner Jørgen Dahl Moe. Presenters were Kåre Magnus Bergh and Ingrid Gjessing Linhave. AF1, Didrik Solli-Tangen and Tine Thing Helseth performed during the competition breaks.

After singing his winning song, Torstein and the three other super finalists joined in to sing "Du er suveren" (translated as You are sovereign), written by Ronny Wikmark and Skjalg Raaen. "Du er suveren" was the joint song recorded by all the ten finalists in MGPjr 2010

The album Melodi Grand Prix Junior 2010 containing the songs of the finals and "Du er suveren"reached No. 1 on the VG-lista Norwegian Albums Chart on weeks 37 and 39 of 2010 staying at the top of the charts for 2 weeks.

Finalists
There were 10 finalists, that included 8 solo artists and two bands singing a variety of songs including ballads, pop and rap.

Results

First round

Super Final
The exact number of public votes was unknown. Only the winner was announced.

References

External links
Official website
Finalist song credits

Melodi Grand Prix Junior
Music festivals in Norway